Rudolph Mighty (born 25 November 1972) is a Jamaican sprinter. He competed in the men's 4 × 100 metres relay at the 1992 Summer Olympics.

References

External links
 

1972 births
Living people
Athletes (track and field) at the 1992 Summer Olympics
Jamaican male sprinters
Olympic athletes of Jamaica
Place of birth missing (living people)